"Begin the Beguine" is a popular song written by Cole Porter. Porter composed the song between Kalabahi, Indonesia and Fiji, during a 1935 Pacific cruise aboard the Cunard ocean liner Franconia. In October 1935, it was introduced by June Knight in the Broadway musical Jubilee, produced at the Imperial Theatre in New York City. Beguine is a dance and music form, similar to a slow rumba.

Music
The beguine  is a dance and music form, similar to a slow rhumba. In his book American Popular Song: The Great Innovators 1900–1950, musicologist and composer Alec Wilder, described "Begin the Beguine" as "a maverick, it  an unprecedented experiment and one which, to this day, after hearing it hundreds of times, I cannot sing or whistle or play from start to finish without the printed music ... about the sixtieth measure I find myself muttering another title, 'End the Beguine' ".

Artie Shaw version
At first, the song gained little popularity, perhaps because of its length and unconventional form. Josephine Baker danced to it in her return to America in the Ziegfeld Follies of 1936, but neither she nor the song were successful. Two years later, however, bandleader Artie Shaw recorded an arrangement of the song, an extended swing orchestra version, in collaboration with his arranger and orchestrator, Jerry Gray.

After signing a new recording contract with RCA Victor, Shaw chose "Begin the Beguine" to be the first of six tunes he would record with his new 14-piece band in his first recording session with RCA. The session was held at RCA's "Studio 2" on East 24th Street in New York on July 24, 1938. Until then, Shaw's band had been having a tough time finding an identity and maintaining its existence without having had any popular hits of significance.  His previous recording contract with Brunswick had lapsed at the end of 1937 without being renewed.

RCA's pessimism with the whole idea of recording the long tune "that nobody could remember from beginning to end anyway" resulted in it being released on the "B" side of the record "Indian Love Call", issued by Bluebird Records as catalog number B-7746 B. Shaw's persistence paid off when "Begin the Beguine" became a best-selling record in 1938, peaking at no. 3, skyrocketing Shaw and his band to fame and popularity. The recording became one of the most famous and popular of the entire Swing Era. Subsequent re-releases by RCA Victor (catalog number 20-1551) and other releases on LPs, tapes and CDs have kept the recording readily available continuously ever since its initial release.

Later popularity
After Shaw introduced the song to dance halls, MGM released the musical film Broadway Melody of 1940. The song is one of its musical numbers, first sung in dramatic style by mezzo-soprano Lois Hodnott on a tropical set, with Eleanor Powell and Fred Astaire dancing in flamenco choreography. It is continued in the then contemporary jazz style by The Music Maids, with Powell and Astaire tap dancing to a big-band accompaniment.

In short order, all the major big bands recorded it, including Harry James, Benny Goodman, Tommy Dorsey and Glenn Miller, often as an instrumental, as in the film. As a vocal song, it also became a pop standard, beginning with Joe Loss and Chick Henderson, the first record to sell a million copies; new interpretations are often still measured against renditions by Frank Sinatra and Ella Fitzgerald, and Elvis Presley did an adaptation of his own. "Begin the Beguine" became such a classic during World War II that Max Beckmann adopted the title for a painting in 1946 (which the University of Michigan Museum of Art purchased in 1948).

Julio Iglesias version

Julio Iglesias recorded a Spanish version of "Begin the Beguine", titled "Volver a Empezar" in Spanish. Iglesias wrote new Spanish lyrics for this song, which is about lost love rather the dance. Apart from the opening lines, the full song is in Spanish. The song was produced in Madrid with an arrangement by producer Ramón Arcusa, using the rhythm from Johnny Mathis' disco version of the song.
The song reached No. 1 in the UK Singles Chart in December 1981. It is the first fully Spanish language song to have reached No. 1 on the British chart, although Iglesias is the second Spanish act to top the chart (after Baccara who topped the chart with an English language song). The song was certified Gold by the BPI in the UK. In Japan, it sold  96,170 units. He also recorded versions of this song in Italian "Venezia a Settembre", French "Une chanson qui revient", and German "aber der Traum war sehr schön".

Charts

Other notable versions

 Xavier Cugat and his orchestra recorded one of the first versions in 1935, with a stronger Latin sound than later versions. The song was recorded as an instrumental, although a vocalist (Don Reid) sings the title and the beginning and end of the song. This recording reached the charts of the day.
 Leslie Hutchinson recorded a version on April 3, 1940.  This recording was given to the Indian spiritual figure Meher Baba, who later asked that it be played seven times at his tomb when his body was laid to rest, which occurred a week after his death on January 31, 1969.
 Eddie Heywood and his orchestra recorded a single version in 1944 and this reached the USA charts in 1945 peaking in the No. 16 spot.
 Frank Sinatra recorded a version on February 24, 1946, which reached the Billboard charts in the No. 23 position.
 Johnny Mathis recorded a popular disco version in 1978.
 Ella Fitzgerald recorded a version for her 1956 album Ella Fitzgerald Sings the Cole Porter Songbook.
 Melora Hardin performed the song in the 1991 film, The Rocketeer. It was featured on both the original and expanded motion picture soundtracks, released in 1991 and 2016 respectively.

See also
List of 1930s jazz standards

References

1935 songs
1930s jazz standards
1938 singles
Bluebird Records singles
Songs written by Cole Porter
Songs from Jubilee (musical)
Ella Fitzgerald songs
Johnny Mathis songs
Mildred Bailey songs
Al Hirt songs
Andy Williams songs
Caterina Valente songs
UK Singles Chart number-one singles
Grammy Hall of Fame Award recipients
Songs about dancing
Songs about music
United States National Recording Registry recordings